Solid Rock is a 1972 album by The Temptations for the Gordy (Motown) label, produced by Norman Whitfield. The LP was the first made primarily without founding members and original lead singers Eddie Kendricks and Paul Williams. Frustrated by conflicts and fights with Temptations Otis Williams and Melvin Franklin, and producer Whitfield's steadfast insistence on producing psychedelic soul for the group when they really wanted to sing ballads, Kendricks had quit the act and negotiated a solo deal with Motown's Tamla label.

Paul Williams, on the other hand, had fallen ill due to complications from sickle-cell disease and six years of untreated alcoholism. Physically incapable of performing any longer, Williams followed his doctor's advice and retired from the act, although he remained on the Temptations' payroll as a choreographer until his death, August 17, 1973. Williams's final Temptations recording, "It's Summer", is the only song on Solid Rock that includes his vocals. The album reached number one on the Billboard R&B album chart on March 4, 1972.

Overview
The Temptations group's paranoia-laced "Smiling Faces Sometimes", a Kendricks-led tune from the Sky's the Limit LP, was already slated as the follow-up to the number-one hit "Just My Imagination (Running Away with Me)". With Kendricks now gone, and with the group lacking a first tenor to take his place, Norman Whitfield was forced to change plans.

Whitfield took the temporarily four-man Temptations and re-recorded "It's Summer", the b-side to "Ball of Confusion (That's What the World Is Today)", as a replacement release. "Smiling Faces Sometimes" was instead released as a single for The Undisputed Truth, and became a Top 5 hit on the Billboard Hot 100. Meanwhile, "It's Summer" peaked at number fifty-one on the Billboard Hot 100, making it the first Temptations single to miss the Top 40 since 1963's "Farewell My Love".

Although Paul Williams kept up an alliance with the Temptations, Kendricks and fellow ex-Temptation David Ruffin vocally spoke out against the group (and Otis Williams in particular) in several 1971 interviews. As a result, the Temptations and Norman Whitfield released the single "Superstar (Remember How You Got Where You Are)", which addressed the rivalry and called Kendricks and Ruffin out as sell-outs. "Superstar" was the first Temptations song to feature Eddie Kendricks' and Paul Williams' replacements, Damon Harris and Richard Street. Ricky Owens from The Vibrations had been the Temptations' original choice for a new first tenor, but Owens only remained with the group a few weeks before being replaced.

Solid Rock's third single, "Take a Look Around", was a Top 30 hit which showcased Harris' Kendricksesque falsetto voice alongside the leads of Richard Street, Dennis Edwards, Otis Williams, and Melvin Franklin. "Take a Look Around" and several of the album tracks, including "What It Is?" and "Stop the War Now", were more of Norman Whitfield's psychedelic soul recordings. By 1972, such songs were being seen by critics and the public as outdated or heavy-handed, and the Temptations themselves became uninterested in the psychedelic songs. Whitfield began adding stronger soul and funk influences to future message tracks, reducing the psychedelic influences present in these and earlier such songs.

Track listing
All tracks produced by Norman Whitfield

Side one
"Take a Look Around" – 2:44 (Barrett Strong, Norman Whitfield) (lead singers: Dennis Edwards, Damon Harris, Melvin Franklin, Richard Street, Otis Williams)
"Ain't No Sunshine" – 7:16 (Bill Withers) (lead singers: Richard Street, Damon Harris)
"Stop the War Now" – 12:28 (Strong, Whitfield) (lead singers: Dennis Edwards, Melvin Franklin)

Side two
"What It Is?" – 5:15 (Strong, Whitfield) (lead singers: Dennis Edwards, Damon Harris, Richard Street)
"Smooth Sailing (From Now On)" – 2:48 (Strong, Whitfield) (lead singer: Damon Harris)
"Superstar (Remember How You Got Where You Are)" – 2:53 (Strong, Whitfield) (lead singers: Dennis Edwards, Damon Harris, Melvin Franklin, Richard Street, Otis Williams)
"It's Summer" – 2:56 (Strong, Whitfield) (lead singer: Dennis Edwards)
"The End of Our Road" – 2:41 (Strong, Whitfield, Roger Penzabene) (lead singer: Richard Street)

Personnel
 Dennis Edwards – vocals (tenor)
 Melvin Franklin – vocals (bass)
 Otis Williams – vocals (tenor/baritone)
 Damon Harris – vocals (tenor/falsetto) (all tracks except "It's Summer")
 Richard Street – vocals (tenor/baritone) (all tracks except "It's Summer")
 Paul Williams – vocals (tenor/baritone) ("It's Summer" only)
 Norman Whitfield – producer
 Barrett Strong – lyricist
 The Funk Brothers – instrumentation

Charts

Weekly charts

Year-end charts

References

See also
List of number-one R&B albums of 1972 (U.S.)

1972 albums
The Temptations albums
Gordy Records albums
Albums produced by Norman Whitfield
Albums recorded at Hitsville U.S.A.